Pomaderris kumeraho or kūmarahou, also known as gumdigger's soap and golden tainui, is a plant endemic to the North Island of New Zealand. The name kūmarahou is a Māori word signifying a shrub.
Kūmarahou grows up to four meters in height, and flowers in September, with yellow blossoms. The name "gumdigger's soap" was given owing to the lather created when the flowers were rubbed with water.

Medicinal uses
Kūmarahou has many uses in traditional Māori medicine, although there is little scientific confirmation of its benefits. Infusions of the leaves have been said to relieve various respiratory ailments and skin disorders.

References

Endemic flora of New Zealand
kumeraho
Taxa named by Eduard Fenzl

Plants used in traditional Māori medicine